Walter Cleveland "Lefty" Stewart (September 23, 1900 in Sparta, Tennessee – September 26, 1974 in Knoxville, Tennessee) was a professional baseball pitcher. He played all or part of ten seasons in Major League Baseball between 1921 and 1935. He played for the Detroit Tigers, St. Louis Browns, Washington Senators, and Cleveland Indians.

Stewart gave up one of Babe Ruth's record-setting 60 home runs during the 1927 season.

Stewart was a better than average hitting pitcher in his major league career. In 279 games, he posted a .204 batting average (115-for-565) with 60 runs, 48 RBI and drawing 64 bases on balls. Defensively, he was above average, recording a .973 fielding percentage which was 18 points higher than the league average during his career.

External links

1900 births
1974 deaths
Detroit Tigers players
St. Louis Browns players
Washington Senators (1901–1960) players
Cleveland Indians players
Major League Baseball pitchers
Baseball players from Tennessee
San Antonio Bears players
New Haven Indians players
Syracuse Stars (minor league baseball) players
Birmingham Barons players
Toronto Maple Leafs (International League) players
Mission Reds players
Memphis Chickasaws players
Bradenton Growers players